Seisdon is a rural village in the parish of Trysull and Seisdon, Staffordshire approximately six miles west of Wolverhampton and the name of one of the five hundreds of Staffordshire. The population recorded at the 2011 census does not distinguish this hamlet from the rest of the parish, which had a population of 1,150.

Etymology
The name appears to mean "hill of the Saxons", deriving from the Anglo-Saxon words Seis meaning Saxon and Dun meaning hill. The first element may alternatively be a personal name.

Location and Sites
Seisdon is a hamlet within the parish of Trysull and Seisdon (formerly named Trysull, only), lying one mile north-west of the village of Trysull, near the border with Shropshire. There is a narrow bridge of several arches over the river Smestow, which is of 18th century origin. On the county boundary there is a high position which formed an ancient entrenchment named Abbot's Wood (Apewood) Castle.

Seisdon Hall is a grade II Listed Building  dating from the 17th century and greatly extended around 1840-1850  by the Aston-Pudset family. Previously known as Green Farm.

History
The hamlet is remarkable for giving the name to the Hundred, for which no adequate authority can now be adduced. However, a large  number  of  Hundred names  refer  to  hills  or  mounds. It seems likely  that  such  sites  were  chosen  as  being'  remote,  and  where interference  was  most  easily  avoided. Placename evidence suggests a fairly early Anglo-Saxon origin for the name. Certainly the village of Seisdon was of sufficient importance prior to the Norman Conquest to have its owners and value recorded in the Domesday Book. Having been held by four English free men before the conquest, it came into the hands of William Fitz-Ansculf who held 600 acres in Seisdon and also land in Trysull and other parts of the parish.

Almost all of its residents were originally employed in the agricultural industry.

Seisdon Hundred

Each hundred was formed to support a military unit. Seisdon Hundred contains the smallest area of the five hundreds of Staffordshire, but it has a relatively high population density and agricultural productivity. It formed the south-western portion of the county, bounded on the west by Shropshire, on the south by Worcestershire, on the east by Offlow Hundred, and on the north by Cuttleston Hundred. The old Forest of Brewood formed the boundary of Seisdon and Cuttleston.

Seisdon Hundred was divided into North and South Divisions. each with their own High Constable.

The Hundred contained Wolverhampton, the largest town of the county, and many populous villages, which were constituted into 18 parishes, part of two others and two extra parochial areas. Wolverhampton parish contained several townships some of which were in Offlow Hundred. The parishes in 1834 were as follows:

The Hundred presented a great diversity of soil and scenery. It was rich in coal, ironstone, lime, and freestone, and renowned for its extensive mines and iron works, and for the manufacture of a great variety of articles in iron, steel, and other metals.

There was a Seisdon Rural District from 1894 to 1974.

Famous people
 Mark Speight (1965 in Seisdon – 2008) – Television presenter and actor

See also
Trysull
Seisdon Rural District
Listed buildings in Trysull and Seisdon

References

External links 

Villages in Staffordshire
South Staffordshire District